Sojeong-ri station is a railway station in Sojeong-myeon, Sejong City, South Korea.

Station 
This station is on the Gyeongbu Line, with 2 platforms for 4 tracks. Because of the fire on March 30, 2004, the station building was reconstructed.

Only 2 Mugunghwa-ho trains stopped at Sojeong-ri station until July 1, 2017.

References 

Railway stations in Sejong